Naval Long Service and Good Conduct Medal could mean:
 Naval Long Service and Good Conduct Medal (1830), the Anchor type medal of the Royal Navy and Royal Marines
 Naval Long Service and Good Conduct Medal (1848), the Ship type medal of the Royal Navy and Royal Marines